Bobby Wahengbam (born 2 February 1971) is an Indian filmmaker, producer, writer and film critic known for his works in Manipuri films. He is the recipient of several accolades, including two National Film Awards. As a film critic, he contributed regularly for local and national newspapers for the last two decades, where some of his writings have been translated into other languages as well. Now, he regularly writes as a cinema critic for The People's Chronicle, a local English daily, every Sunday for the last four years.

Wahengbam is the founder of the production house Third Eye. Under it, his film Apaiba Leichil was produced. All the documentaries under his production/direction are scripted by him. He also gave lectures, talks and classes on various occasions like Ritwich Film Festival 2013, Karimganj; North East Film Festival 2019, Pune and Article 19 - Communication Festival 2019 at Manipal School of Communications, Karnataka.

Education
Wahengbam attended Imphal College where he studied PU Sc (Science). He enrolled at St. Xavier's College, Mumbai to pursue a bachelor's degree in History and later earned a master's degree from the University of Bombay in 1994. He received diploma in Film & TV Production from Xavier's Institute of Communication, Mumbai in 1993.

Accolades
 Writing on Film

 Film & TV Production/Direction

Bibliography

Filmography

References

Living people
Film directors from Manipur
Indian film directors
Meitei people
People from Imphal
1971 births